{
  "type": "FeatureCollection",
  "features": [
    {
      "type": "Feature",
      "properties": {},
      "geometry": {
        "type": "Point",
        "coordinates": [
          74.86664414405824,
          34.10316995155632
        ]
      }
    }
  ]
}

Char Chinar, also sometimes called Char Chinari, Ropa Lank, or Rupa Lank, is an island in Dal Lake in the city of Srinagar in Jammu and Kashmir, India. Dal Lake includes 3 islands, 2 of which are marked with beautiful Chinar trees. The island located on the Lakut Dal (small Dal) is known as Roph Lank (Silver Island), is marked with the presence of majestic Chinar trees at the four corners, thus known as Char-Chinari (Four Chinars). The second Chinar Island, known as Sone Lank (Gold Island), is located on the Bod Dal (Big Dal) and overlooks the holy shrine of Hazratbal.

History 
Murad Baksh, brother of the Mughal emperor Aurangzeb, constructed the Roph Lank.

Chinar 

Chinar trees characteristically grow in Eastern Himalayas. Their botanical name is Platanus orientalis. They have been an important part of Kashmiri tradition, in that, a Chinar tree is found in almost every village in Kashmir. These trees have survived for ages, because Chinar is basically a long-living tree. It spreads wide across a region of cool climate with sufficient water. The tree has several properties - leaves and bark are used as medicine, the wood, known as lace wood, has been used for delicate furniture and the twigs and roots are used for making dyes.

Decline and restoration 
Chinar all over Jammu and Kashmir have been affected due to various reasons such as indiscriminate tree felling and floods. It is common to find locals and media houses reporting that the four chinar at Char Chinar no longer are as majestic as they once were. Three of the four trees have shown signs of drying up. Some locals blame construction on the island, whereas others blame recent floods and climate change.

The floriculture department of Jammu and Kashmir is making efforts to restore the island to its former glory and have also planted more Chinar trees on the island.

Gallery

References

External links
Photo of Char Chinar (Rupa Lank)
Photo of Char Chinar (YongKianOn)
Kashmir Beauty-Chinar 

Islands of Jammu and Kashmir
Srinagar
Lake islands of India
Islands of India
Uninhabited islands of India
Char Chinar Dal lake, Srinagar Kashmir